Manoj Sarkar (born 12 January 1990) is an Indian para-badminton player .He has won 50 international medals in which he have 19 gold medals, 13 silver medals & 18 bronze medals. He is the only Arjun Awardee and Para Olympian Bronze medalist from Uttarakhand. He is awarded by President of India in 2018 by Arjun award. He is supported by the GoSports Foundation through the Para Champions Programme.

Early life and background 

Manoj's condition arose out of wrongful medical treatment at the age of one. He hails from a modest background and has two siblings. He suffers from a PPRP Lower Limb condition.

Career 

Manoj has won numerous accolades in the International circuit including a Men's Singles Silver at the Thailand Para-Badminton International 2017, A Gold at the Uganda Para-Badminton International 2017, a silver at the Irish Para-Badminton International 2016 and a Gold in the men's doubles event at the BWF Para-Badminton World Championships 2015. He also won a gold medal at the Turkish Para-badminton International Championship in May 2018.

Achievements

Paralympic Games 
Men's singles SL3

World Championships 

Men's singles

Men's doubles

Mixed doubles

Asian Para Games 

Men's singles

Men's doubles

Asian Championships 
Men's singles

Men's doubles

BWF Para Badminton World Circuit (1 title) 
The BWF Para Badminton World Circuit – Grade 2, Level 1, 2 and 3 tournaments has been sanctioned by the Badminton World Federation from 2022.

Men's doubles

International Tournaments (15 titles, 11 runners-up) 
Men's singles

Singles

Men's doubles

Doubles

Mixed doubles

Awards 
 Arjuna Award 25 September 2018

References

External links 
indusind.com

Notes 

1990 births
Living people
Indian male badminton players
Indian male para-badminton players
Recipients of the Arjuna Award
Paralympic badminton players of India
Badminton players at the 2020 Summer Paralympics
Paralympic bronze medalists for India
Paralympic medalists in badminton
Medalists at the 2020 Summer Paralympics